Theobald II (923/925 – July 957/961 or 964) was the Duke of Spoleto and Margrave of Camerino from 953. He was the son of Boniface II of Spoleto and Waldrada.

In 959, Berengar and Guy of Ivrea led an expedition against Theobald. They defeated him and captured both Spoleto and Camerino.  Duke Theobald was deposed by Emperor Otto I around the year 964 because of his support for the deposed Pope John XII.The Chronicles of Farfa suggest that he was succeeded by Count Transmond of Camerino, but there are no documents attesting to this succession.  Instead it seems likely that Theobald was succeeded by Otto's loyal supporter Prince Pandulf I (Pandulf Ironhead).

Further reading
Edoardo Manarini, I due volti del potere. Una parentela atipica di ufficiali e signori nel regno italico, Milano, Ledizioni, 2019, online edition on  Academia.edu and  Leedizioni

10th-century dukes of Spoleto
10th-century Lombard people
920s births
10th-century deaths
Year of birth uncertain
Year of death uncertain